Dörte Hansen (also known as Dörte Hansen-Jaax, born 1964 in Husum, West Germany) is a German linguist, journalist and writer.

Life 
Hansen grew up in Högel in Nordfriesland; her family spoke Low German at home. She learned her "first foreign language," Standard German, in elementary school.

After graduating high school (Abitur) in 1984, she studied sociolinguistics, English studies, Romance studies and Frisian studies at the Christian Albrechts University Kiel. In 1994, Hansen received her doctorate at the University of Hamburg with a sociolinguistic thesis on a special form of bilingualism.

Hansen is married to documentary filmmaker  and has a daughter. From 2005 to 2016, she lived with her family in Steinkirchen, Lower Saxony and now lives in Husum.

Work 
After an internship at the magazine Merian she worked until 2008 as a journalist for several radio stations (NDR, WDR, SWR, hr, DLF) and various magazines, until 2012 then as a permanent cultural editor at NDR Info. Since then, she has worked as a freelance author.

In her first novel, Altes Land (2015), Hansen worked critically on the subject of homeland: many city dwellers discovered the countryside as a place of longing for themselves and moved to a village. In Hansen's opinion, however, they were subject to a mistake because they only played country life and made "peasant theater". Hansen connects this topic with the fate of the female protagonist as a homeless postwar refugee from East Prussia in the Altes Land. The book was a bestseller and received praise from most critics.

Her second novel Mittagsstunde (2018) explores German village life. The cultural and interpersonal change in the fictional North Frisian village "Brinkebüll" is portrayed from the 1960s to the present day. The author tells the story without idealizing country life and draws in laconic language often bizarre characters with a lot of empathy.

Memberships 

 PEN Centre Germany

Awards 

 2006: Media Prize of the foundation "Children's Rights in the One World" in the radio category for her NDR reportage Der Hamburger Kompass – Hilfe für Kinder alkoholkranker Eltern.
 2015:  for Altes Land.
 2016:  for Altes Land
 2019: Rheingau Literatur Preis for Mittagsstunde
 2019: Niederdeutscher Literaturpreis der Stadt Kappeln
 2019: Grimmelshausen Literaturpreis for Mittagsstunde
 2022: Mainzer Stadtschreiber
 2022:

Publications 

 
 

 Fürchte dich nicht vor dem Familienberater. Reportage. In: Chrismon, December 2009.
  (Der Spiegel Bestseller list number 1)
  (Der Spiegel Bestseller list number 1)
 
  (Der Spiegel Bestseller list number 2)

Translations

Audio books

Film versions
 2020: , director: Sherry Hormann
 2022: Mittagsstunde, director:

References

Further reading

External links 
 

German women journalists
German radio journalists
German women novelists
21st-century German novelists
Sociolinguists
Norddeutscher Rundfunk people
1964 births
Living people
People from Husum
North Frisians
Pages with unreviewed translations
21st-century German women
University of Hamburg alumni